Wayne Ferreira was the defending champion and lost in the quarterfinals to Goran Ivanišević.

Ivanišević won in the final 6–4, 6–3 against Albert Costa.

Seeds
A champion seed is indicated in bold text while text in italics indicates the round in which that seed was eliminated.

  Thomas Muster (first round)
  Thomas Enqvist (quarterfinals)
  Jim Courier (first round)
  Goran Ivanišević (champion)
  Wayne Ferreira (quarterfinals)
  Marc Rosset (first round)
  Andriy Medvedev (second round)
  Gilbert Schaller (first round)

Draw

References
 1996 Dubai Tennis Championships Draw

1996 Dubai Tennis Championships
Singles